Stephen K. Gunn is Executive Co-Chairman and co-Founder of Sleep Country Canada Inc, which he co-founded with Christine Magee and Gordon Lownds. As of June 2013, the company has 201 stores across Canada and 43 stores in the US (Sleep America).

Early life 
Gunn grew up in Montreal and Kingston. He completed an honours BSc in Electrical Engineering from Queen's University and an MBA from the Richard Ivey School of Business (1981).

Career 
After university he joined McKinsey & Company as a Management Consultant (1981–1987). In 1987, he co-founded and was the President of Kenrick Capital, a private equity business. In October 1994, he co-founded Sleep Country Canada with Christine Magee and Gordon Lownds. He is currently on the board of directors for Dollarama, Cara Operations and Golf Town. He succeeded Larry Rossy as chairman of the board of directors of Dollarama on March 29, 2018.

Personal life 
Gunn is married with a daughter and 3 sons. He enjoys golf, sailing and skiing.

Awards 
1998- Financial Post named him and Christine Magee the Ontario Entrepreneur of the Year, Retail/Wholesale
2003- Inducted into the Canadian Retail Hall of Fame, Retail Council of Canada
2004- Inducted into the Canadian Marketing Hall of Legends
2006- Recipient of CIRAS Henry Singer Award for exceptional leadership in the retailing and services sectors

References

External links 

Sleep Country Canada Plans Expansion into the U.S.
Steve Gunn Guest Speaker

1954 births
Living people
Queen's University at Kingston alumni
University of Western Ontario alumni
Businesspeople from Toronto
Canadian people of British descent
Businesspeople from Montreal
People from Kingston, Ontario
Anglophone Quebec people
Canadian company founders
Canadian chief executives